As You Like It is a pastoral comedy by William Shakespeare.

As You Like It may also refer to:
 As You Like It (1912 film), 1912 silent adaptation, directed by J. Stuart Blackton for his Vitagraph Company  
 As You Like It (1936 film), adaptation directed by Paul Czinner
 As You Like It (1978), BBC Television Shakespeare, season one, directed by Basil Coleman
 As You Like It (1991 film), adaptation directed by Christine Edzard
 As You Like It (2006 film), adaptation directed by Kenneth Branagh
 As You Like It (TV series), Chinese-language television program
 "As You Like It", 1962 single by Adam Faith
 As You Like It (Friedrich Gulda album), by Friedrich Gulda
 As You Like It (Barenaked Ladies album), 2005 album
 As You Like It, play by Natyaguru Nurul Momen